Jhok Sarkari is a village in Punjab. It located 25 km away from Faridkot, Punjab. It is Basically Sandhu community's village, but with the time more communities migrated from other places. The population as per 2011 census was 1185 people. a big Ganges Canal (Rajasthan) passes through the village. 5 main roads are crossing through the village from them 4 are constructed as solid roads and one is kacha raasta towards Saideke

Demographics

Nearby villages

The nearest railway station
The nearest railway station to Jhoke Sarkari is Kohar Singhwala which is located in and around 9.2 kilometers distance. The following table shows other railway stations and its distance from Jhok.

Kohar Singhwala railway station 9.2 km.

Guru Har Sahai railway station 14.6 km.

Golehwala railway station 15.7 km.

Firozpur Cantonment railway station 21.0 km.

Firozpur railway station 22.2 km.

Sports and Health 
The village has no gym and no playground. time to time youngster requests Member of the Legislative Assembly (MLA) for gym and playground but every time he makes fool of them. The club Yuvak Sewawa Club  ((ਯੁਵਕ ਸੇਵਾਵਾ ਕਲੱਬ, ਝੋਕ ਸਰਕਾਰੀ)) organises a volleyball tournament each year. It has a very well-operating volleyball ground. The players from nearby villages daily come to play here and also participate in the volleyball tournament.

References 

Villages in Faridkot district